Dos Historias is a 2006 greatest hits album featuring the music of American Tejano singer Selena and Mexican singer-songwriter Ana Bárbara.

Track listing
 "Como La Flor" - (with Selena)
 "La Trampa" - (with Ana Bárbara)
 "Amor Prohibido" - (with Selena)
 "Lo Busque" - (with Ana Bárbara)
 "Fotos Y Recuerdos" - (with Selena)
 "Todo Lo Aprendi De Ti" - (with Ana Bárbara)
 "No Me Queda Mas" - (with Selena)
 "Bandido" - (with Ana Bárbara)
 "Tú Sólo Tú" - (with Selena)
 "Te Regalo La Lluvia" - (with Ana Bárbara)
 "Baila Esta Cumbia" - (with Selena)
 "Ya No Te Creo Nada" - (with Ana Bárbara)
 "Dreaming of You" - (with Selena)
 "Como Me Haces Falta" - (with Ana Bárbara)

DVDs 
No Me Queda Mas (Selena)
Ya No Te Cero Nada (Ana Bárbara)
Dreaming Of You (Selena)
Bandido (Ana Bárbara)

Charts

References

2006 greatest hits albums
Selena compilation albums
Compilation albums published posthumously
Albums recorded at Q-Productions